Henry ″Harry″ Duncan Spens Goodsir (3 November 1819 – ) was a Scottish physician and naturalist who contributed to the pioneering work on cell theory done by his brother John Goodsir. He served as surgeon and naturalist on the ill-fated Franklin expedition. His body was never found, but forensic studies in 2009 on skeletal remains earlier recovered from King William Island in Canada suggest that they may be those of Harry Goodsir.

Early life 
Harry Goodsir was born on 3 November 1819 in Anstruther, Fife, the son of Dr. John Goodsir, a medical practitioner. His paternal grandfather, also Dr. John Goodsir had been a medical practitioner in the nearby town of Lower Largo. 
Three of Harry's brothers became medical practitioners. John Goodsir, his elder brother, would become Professor of Anatomy at Edinburgh University and a pioneer of the doctrine that cells formed the basis of living organisms. His younger brother Robert Anstruther Goodsir qualified as a medical doctor from the University of St Andrews, and Archibald studied in Edinburgh and Leipzig and qualified with membership of the Royal College of Surgeons of England.

Career 
He studied medicine in Edinburgh and became a member of the Royal Medical Society. Having qualified as Licentiate of the Royal College of Surgeons of Edinburgh in 1840, he succeeded his brother John as Conservator of the Surgeons' Hall Museum in August 1843. He held this post until March 1845, when he left to join the Franklin expedition, and he was succeeded as conservator by his brother Archibald.

Cell theory 
In 1845, he co-authored, with his brother John, Anatomical and Pathological Observations. This contained John's unpublished 1841–1842 lectures to which his brother had "added some of his own zoological, anatomical, and pathological observations." The three chapters supplied by Harry were seen by his brother as providing important confirmatory evidence to his cellular theory. It was this book that was to win John Goodsir international acclaim and led to the German pathologist Rudolph Virchow dedicating his epoch-making volume to him.

Franklin expedition 
There were four medical officers: surgeon Stephen Stanley and assistant surgeon Harry Goodsir on HMS Erebus, and surgeon John Peddie  and assistant surgeon Alexander McDonald on HMS Terror.

Goodsir's final communication was a paper entitled "On the anatomy of Forbesia", which was "... transmitted by the author from Disko Island in Greenland in June 1845." This was published five years later, and is a comprehensive description of the insect species with 18 detailed illustrations. He is described as "Acting assistant surgeon on HMS Erebus". The expedition was last seen by Europeans one month later in July 1845.

Goodsir's younger brother Robert joined two of the expeditions which attempted to find the Franklin expedition. In 1849, he joined the whaler Advice under the command of Scotsman William Penny, in what was the first of many unsuccessful attempts to find Franklin and his men. Robert Goodsir wrote an account of this voyage: An Arctic voyage to Baffin's Bay and Lancaster Sound: in search of friends with Sir John Franklin. He joined Penny again in 1850 as surgeon on the Admiralty-backed Franklin search expedition with the ships Lady Franklin and Sophia.

Robert Goodsir graduated as a medical doctor from St. Andrews University in 1852, but rarely practiced medicine, travelling to New Zealand as a gold prospector and to Australia as a sheep farmer, before returning to Edinburgh where he died in 1895. He is buried there in Dean Cemetery.

Remains 

Between 1849 and 1959, skeletal remains representing at least 30 individuals were discovered on King William Island, and most were buried locally. In 1869, American explorer Charles Francis Hall was taken by local Inuit to a shallow grave on King William Island containing well-preserved skeletal remains and fragments of clothing. These remains were repatriated and interred beneath the Franklin Memorial at Greenwich Old Royal Naval College, London. The remains were thought to be those of an officer due to the remnants of a silk vest in which the body had been clothed and a gold tooth filling. After examination of the remains by the eminent biologist Thomas Henry Huxley, the Admiralty concluded that the remains were those of Henry Le Vesconte, a lieutenant on HMS Erebus.

A subsequent examination in 2009 of the "well-preserved and fairly complete skeleton of a young adult male of European ancestry" included a facial reconstruction that showed "excellence of fit" with the face of Harry Goodsir, as portrayed in his 1845 daguerreotype. Strontium and oxygen isotope data from tooth enamel were consistent with an upbringing in eastern Scotland, but not with Lt. Le Vesconte's upbringing in southwest England.  A further clue suggesting these might be Goodsir's remains was a gold filling in a premolar tooth, unusual at that time. Goodsir's family were friendly with Robert Nasmyth, an Edinburgh dentist with an international reputation for such work. Harry's brother John had served as dental apprentice to Nasmyth. Analysis of the bones suggest that death was caused by an infected tooth.

In popular culture 
Harry Goodsir appears as a character in the 2007 novel The Terror by Dan Simmons, a fictionalized account of Franklin's lost expedition, as well as the 2018 television adaptation, where he is portrayed by Paul Ready.

See also
List of people who disappeared mysteriously at sea

References

External links 
 
 
 
 

1819 births
1840s deaths
1840s missing person cases
19th-century explorers
19th-century Scottish medical doctors
Explorers of the Arctic
Franklin's lost expedition
Lost explorers
Missing person cases in Canada
People from Anstruther
People lost at sea
Royal Navy Medical Service officers
Scottish biologists
Scottish curators
Scottish polar explorers